Periconiella cocoes is an ascomycete fungus that is a plant pathogen affecting the coconut.

See also 
 List of coconut palm diseases

References

External links 
 Index Fungorum
 USDA ARS Fungal Database

Fungal plant pathogens and diseases
Coconut palm diseases
Ascomycota enigmatic taxa